The AFAS Stadion is a football stadium in Mechelen, Belgium. It is used for football matches and is the home ground of KV Mechelen. Currently, the ground has a capacity of 16,672. The stadium is called Achter de Kazerne, which means "Behind the Army Barracks". It is called this because the stadium was once located behind an army base.

In the past it was called Scarletstadion (2003–2006) after the stadium's sponsor Scarlet. It was the first commercialised stadium name in Belgium. After this, Veolia took over the deal (2006–2009) followed by Argos Oil until May 2015. AFAS Software started with a sponsorship deal and is currently the name-holder of Achter de Kazerne. A major reconstruction of the stadium started in 2015 and finished in 2020.

AZ, a team from Alkmaar, Netherlands, also plays in an AFAS-sponsored stadium.

References

External links
 www.afasstadion.be Official website AFAS Stadion (Dutch)
 www.kvmechelen.be Official website KV Mechelen (Dutch)

K.V. Mechelen
Football venues in Flanders
Sports venues in Antwerp Province
Buildings and structures in Mechelen